Cautinella is a monotypic genus of South American dwarf spiders containing the single species, Cautinella minuta. It was first described by Alfred Frank Millidge in 1985, and has only been found in Chile.

See also
 List of Linyphiidae species

References

Linyphiidae
Monotypic Araneomorphae genera
Spiders of South America
Endemic fauna of Chile